Charlotte Bolles Anthony (August 18, 1841 – July 8, 1877), also known as Lottie B. Anthony, was an American women's rights activist and suffragist. Anthony was one of 14 women arrested with Susan B. Anthony after they illegally voted in Rochester, N.Y. on November 5, 1872.

"Lottie" as she was known, began teaching at age 14. She also was known for her fine singing voice, and performed in concerts for local charities. In 1866, she married Daniel B. Anthony, a third cousin of Susan B. Anthony. The couple had four children, and they lived at 101 West Avenue. Southern University's College Administration Building in Baton Rouge, Louisiana was named Lottie Anthony Hall in her honor.

References 

1841 births
1877 deaths
American feminists
American suffragists
American women's rights activists
Burials at Mount Hope Cemetery (Rochester)
Activists from Rochester, New York